Yazakumari was a queen consort of King Sithu I of the Pagan Dynasty of Myanmar (Burma). She had no children. Queen Ti Lawka Sanda Dewi was her elder sister.

References

Bibliography
 
 

Queens consort of Pagan